Deto may refer to:

 DETO Twenterand, a Dutch football club
 Deto (crustacean), a genus of woodlice
 Deto Station, a metro station in Osaka, Japan

See also
 Detto (disambiguation)